Alexander David Gregor MacKenzie (born 9 July 1956 in Inverness) is a former Scottish international rugby union player. His regular playing position was Prop.

Background

MacKenzie was educated at Strathallan School in Perthshire. He now runs a farm near Hanmer Springs, Canterbury, New Zealand.

International honours

MacKenzie was capped once in 1984 at prop against  on 8 December as part of their 1984 tour of Britain and Ireland. Australia won the match 37–12 at Murrayfield.

References

1956 births
Living people
Scottish rugby union players
Scotland international rugby union players
Rugby union players from Inverness
People educated at Strathallan School
Scottish expatriates in New Zealand
Rugby union props